Ronneburg may refer to:

Ronneburg, Hesse, a town in Germany
Ronneburg, Thuringia, a town in Germany
Rauna Castle, a former residence of the Archbishop of Riga in modern Latvia
Rönneburg, Hamburg, Germany